Zhijiang Town is a town and the county seat of Zhijiang Dong Autonomous County in Hunan, China. The town has 40 villages and 12 communities under its jurisdiction, its seat of local government is at Qianjie Community.

Administrative divisions

References

Zhijiang Dong Autonomous County
County seats in Hunan